Craig Custance is an Editorial Director at The Athletic where he manages the NHL, MLB and college football groups. He's also host of The Full 60 podcast. He was a national hockey writer for ESPN and ESPN The Magazine from 2011 to 2017 and Sporting News from 2008 to 2011. He also covered the Atlanta Thrashers for the Atlanta Journal-Constitution. On May 26, 2017, Custance announced he was leaving ESPN. On June 19, 2017 he announced via Twitter that he would be joining The Athletic to launch their new Detroit division.

Custance graduated from Michigan State University in 1999. He lives in Clinton Township, Michigan, with his wife and three children.  His book "Behind the Bench: Inside the Minds of Hockey's Greatest Coaches" (Triumph Books) was released in October 2017.

References

External links
 

Year of birth missing (living people)
Living people
Michigan State University alumni
American sportswriters
Place of birth missing (living people)
People from Grosse Pointe, Michigan